Saint Joavan may refer to:

 Saint Joavan (died c. 562), Irish priest and bishop in Brittany.
 Jovan Vladimir (990–1016), ruler of Duklja, Serbian principality